The women's 400 metres event  at the 1975 European Athletics Indoor Championships was held on 8 and 9 March in Katowice.

Medalists

Results

Heats
Held on 8 March.The winner of each heat (Q) and the next 2 fastest (q) qualified for the final.

Final
Held on 9 March.

References

400 metres at the European Athletics Indoor Championships
400